Frédéric Chevillon (12 January 1879 – 21 February 1915) was a French politician.

Early life
Chevillon was born on 12 January 1879 in Marseille, France. His father, Joseph Chevillon, was a politician.

Career
He served as a member of the Chamber of Deputies from 1912 to 1915. He was mayor 
of Allauch from 1910.

Death
He died on 21 February 1915 in Les Éparges, France.

Legacy
His statue, designed by Henri Raybaud, was dedicated on the Place de la corderie-Henri Bergasse in Marseille in 1917.

References

1879 births
1915 deaths
Politicians from Marseille
Independent Radical politicians
Members of the 10th Chamber of Deputies of the French Third Republic
Members of the 11th Chamber of Deputies of the French Third Republic
Chevaliers of the Légion d'honneur
Recipients of the Croix de Guerre 1914–1918 (France)
French military personnel killed in World War I